Stefan Körner (born 8 November 1968) is a German politician who has been the Chairman of the Pirate Party Germany from June 2014  to August 2016.

References

1968 births
Pirate Party Germany politicians
Living people